Devich (also Romanized as Devīch and Dovīch; also known as  Devīj, Duyuch, and Dyuyuch’) is a village in Kaghazkonan-e Markazi Rural District, Kaghazkonan District, Meyaneh County, East Azerbaijan Province, Iran. At the 2006 census, its population was 88, in 41 families.

References 

Populated places in Meyaneh County